The following lists events that happened during 1916 in Chile.

Incumbents
President of Chile: Juan Luis Sanfuentes

Events

July
14 July – The Club Deportivo Ferroviarios is founded.

Births
16 July – Patricio Carvajal (d. 1994)
22 September – Enrique Accorsi (d. 1990)
23 September – Carlos Ruiz Fuller (d. 1997)
13 October – Ismael Huerta (d. 1997)

Deaths 
8 December – Germán Riesco (b. 1854)

References 

 
Years of the 20th century in Chile
Chile